Miklós Tátrai (born 19 September 1986) is a Hungarian sports shooter. He competed in the men's 10 metre air pistol event at the 2016 Summer Olympics.

References

External links
 

1986 births
Living people
Hungarian male sport shooters
Olympic shooters of Hungary
Shooters at the 2016 Summer Olympics
Place of birth missing (living people)